The Kazmierz Sosnowski Main Beskid Trail (Polish Główny Szlak Beskidzki imienia Kazmierza Sosnowskiego, "GSB") is a long-distance trail marked in red that leads from Ustroń in the Silesian Beskids to Wołosate in the Bieszczady Mountains.

At about 496 km long it is the longest trail in the Polish mountains. It crosses the Silesian Beskid, the Żywiec Beskid (Beskid Żywiecki), the Gorce Mountains, Beskid Sądecki, the Low Beskids (Beskid Niski) and the Bieszczady Mountains. Covering the highest parts of the Polish Beskids it enables reaching Stożek Wielki (in Czech Velký Stožek), Barania Góra, Babia Góra, Polica, Turbacz, Lubań, Przehyba, Radziejowa, Jaworzyna Krynicka, Rotunda, Cergowa, Chryszczata, Smerek and Halicz as well as to the localities like: Ustroń, Węgierska Górka, Jordanów, Rabka-Zdrój, Krościenko nad Dunajcem, Rytro, Krynica-Zdrój, Iwonicz-Zdrój, Rymanów-Zdrój, Komańcza, Cisna, Ustrzyki Górne etc.

The Main Beskid Trail was created during the interwar period. The route of the western part (Ustroń-Krynica) was designed by Kazimierz Sosnowski and it was finished in 1929. The eastern part, according to the project by Mieczysław Orłowicz, was finished in 1935 and it led until Chornohora that was located at this time within the borders of Poland. Between 1935 and 1939 it was named after Józef Piłsudski.

Records 
Currently the shortest time of crossing belongs to Rafał Kot a.k.a. Góral z Mazur (MUAY Running Team) and it was 107 hours 19 minutes. He succeeded to perform this achievement between 28 Sept and 02 Oct 2020. Before him there was Roman Ficek with 4d 11h 25m on 2020-07-02 and Rafał Bielawa with 4d 12h 55m on 2017-10-15band before that Maciej Więcek (inov-8 team PL) and his 114 hours and 50 minutes. He succeeded to perform this achievement between 20–24 June 2013. Previously for almost 7 years this record belonged to Piotr Kłosowicz who took 168 hours to cover the trail in September 2006. The two contestants overmastered the GSB from east to west, however Piotr Kłosowicz did it without a supporting team while Maciej Więcek had support. In 2014 the ultra-marathon runner Łukasz Pawłowski overmastered the trail in 158 hours and 7 minutes without a supporting team.

See also 
 the Mieczysław Orłowicz Main Sudetes Trail from Świeradów Zdrój to Prudnik.

References

External links 
 The exact route of the trail
 Report from the GSB (April 2011)
 A site about the GSB
 The exact description of the trail's route
 Everything about the Main Beskid Trail
 The extensive photo gallery from the trail

Hiking trails in Poland